Henrik Bellman (born 24 March 1999) is a Swedish footballer who plays as a midfielder for Belgian club RSCA Futures.

Club career
On 12 January 2023, Bellman signed a contract until the end of the season with RSCA Futures in Belgium.

References

External links
Henrik Bellman at SvFF

1999 births
Living people
Association football midfielders
Swedish footballers
Sweden youth international footballers
Östersunds FK players
Levanger FK players
RSCA Futures players
Allsvenskan players
Norwegian Second Division players
Superettan players
Challenger Pro League players
Swedish expatriate footballers
Expatriate men's footballers in Denmark
Swedish expatriate sportspeople in Denmark
Expatriate footballers in Norway
Swedish expatriate sportspeople in Norway
Expatriate footballers in Belgium
Swedish expatriate sportspeople in Belgium